Statistics of the Myanmar Premier League in the 2008 season.

Overview
Kanbawza won the championship.

Teams
Finance and Revenue
Ministry of Commerce 
Transport
Ministry of Energy    
YC Development Committee 
Kanbawza  
Construction  
Home Affairs       
Forestry        
Defence      
Myanmar Railway
A&I 
Royal Eleven
Army

See also
2000 Myanmar Premier League
2003 Myanmar Premier League
2004 Myanmar Premier League
2005 Myanmar Premier League
2006 Myanmar Premier League
2007 Myanmar Premier League

References
http://www.rsssf.com/tablesm/myan08.html

Myanmar Premier League seasons
Burma
Burma
1